Spring-heeled Jack (also Springheel Jack, Spring-heel'd Jack, etc.) is a Victorian character, notorious for his frightening leaps.

Spring-heeled Jack may also refer to:

Fictional entities
Springheel Jack, a minor villain in the WB animated series Jackie Chan Adventures
Springheel Jack, a serial killer central to the plot of the Stephen King short story "Strawberry Spring"

Literature and comics
Spring-Heeled Jack (play), a 1950 British play by Geoffrey Carlile 
Springheeled Jack (comics), a comic based on the figure from folklore
Spring-Heeled Jack (1989), a children's novel by Philip Pullman

Music
Spring Heel Jack, an English electronic music group
Spring Heeled Jack (band), a third-wave American ska band

See also
The Curse of the Wraydons (1946), a 1946 British film featuring Spring-Heeled Jack